Robert Beaulieu (3 November 1896 – 2 May 1977) was a French racing cyclist. He rode in the 1922 Tour de France and the 1925 Tour de France.

References

1896 births
1977 deaths
French male cyclists
Place of birth missing